The Mount Carmel Center was a large compound building used by the Branch Davidians religious group located near Axtell, Texas, 20 miles north-east of Waco. The Branch Davidians were a breakaway sect from Davidian Seventh-day Adventists, established by Benjamin Roden in 1959 and later led by David Koresh starting in the 1980s. Named after the Biblical mountain Mount Carmel in northern Israel, it was the site of the 51-day Waco siege. The siege began on February 28, 1993, when federal agents attempted to execute a warrant and arrest some Davidians living inside. A subsequent firefight left four Bureau of Alcohol, Tobacco, and Firearms (ATF) agents and six Davidians dead. At the end of the siege, on April 19, 1993, a fire broke out, burning through most of the compound and killing 76 Branch Davidians.

Etymology 

Some news reports about the siege referred to it as the "Branch Davidian compound". The name derives from a particular verse from the Bible, on which the Branch Davidians partially based their beliefs:

History 

In 1935, Shepherd's Rod (also known as the Davidians) founder Victor Houteff established the original Davidian headquarters at Mount Carmel Center, near Lake Waco, west of the town. After Houteff's death in 1955, his widow Florence usurped the leadership and began selling off parcels of the land, as the neighboring city of Waco began encroaching upon the Mount Carmel Community. In 1957, she sold off the last of the property and bought a  property in the countryside northeast of Waco, christened New Mount Carmel. Today, Waco's Mount Carmel Drive runs through the Old Mount Carmel area, and nearby Charboneau and Hermanson Drives are named after key Davidian families.

In 1962, Florence Houteff announced that she was disbanding Davidian organization, with the assets to be sold off and the proceeds disbursed among her Executive Council. This arrangement was opposed by many members. Most of the New Mount Carmel property was acquired by the Double EE Ranch, but the Branch Davidians retained a core  area around the administrative building.

The fragmentation of Mount Carmel caused a schism in the already permanently-splintered Davidian Seventh-day Adventist movement. Some post-Carmel Davidian groups have also named their headquarters Mount Carmel Center, seeking to carry on its past traditions. Davidians based in Salem, South Carolina use the name, as well as a group that broke away from them, in Mountaindale, New York. Some of the Mountaindale Davidians came to believe that Victor Houteff never wanted to abandon Old Mount Carmel, and in the early 1990s moved back to Waco. They established themselves in a building on Mount Carmel Drive, constructed by Houteff's Davidians. They are across the street from the Vanguard School, a prep school whose buildings were also originally built by the Davidians. Other Davidian groups believe that Mount Carmel represented a doctrinal era in the Davidian Seventh Day Adventist Movement, an era which is now past.

In 1998, three buildings at the former Branch Davidian compound were destroyed in a fire that was deemed suspicious. They were the home of Amo Bishop Roden, wife of former Branch Davidian leader George Roden, and two museums she used to record the group's history. There have been various sects and generations of communities that have resided on and/or used the property east of Waco on Double EE Ranch Road. Not all groups or individuals within these groups share the same religious theology or approach to spirituality. Efforts to memorialize the events of 1993 on the property have been altered over the years since 1993.

References

External links 

 "Branch Davidians See Conspiracy in Highway Project" at NPR

1993 disestablishments in Texas
Buildings and structures demolished in 1993
Houses in McLennan County, Texas
Waco siege